Robert Garnell Kaufman (April 18, 1925 – January 12, 1986) was an American Beat poet and surrealist as well as a jazz performance artist and satirist. In France, where his poetry had a large following, he was known as the "black American Rimbaud."

Early life and education 
Born in New Orleans, Louisiana, Kaufman was the 10th of 13 children.  His paternal grandfather was a German Jew, and his mother was from an established Black Roman Catholic New Orleans family.  His claims that his maternal grandmother practiced voodoo were later refuted. At the age of 18, Kaufman joined the United States Merchant Marine, which he left in the early 1940s to briefly study literature at New York City's The New School for Social Research. In New York, reportedly he met William S. Burroughs and Allen Ginsberg. However, Ginsberg has said he did not meet Kaufman until 1959 (Cherkovski, Collected Poems of Bob Kaufman, p. xv). He also knew the photographer Robert Frank in New York in the late 1940s.

Career 

During Kaufman's time at The New School and in New York, he found inspiration in the writings of Herman Melville, Walt Whitman, Arthur Rimbaud, Guillaume Apollinaire, Federico Garcia Lorca, Hart Crane, Gertrude Stein, Langston Hughes, Frantz Fanon, Aimé Césaire, and Nicolás Guillén. He also identified with the works of jazz musicians and improvisational artists such as Charlie Parker, whom he named his son after.

Kaufman moved to San Francisco's North Beach in 1958 and remained there for most of the rest of his life.

Kaufman frequently expressed his desire to be forgotten as both a writer and a person. Kaufman, a poet in the oral tradition, usually didn't write down his poems, and much of his published work survives by way of his wife Eileen, who wrote his poems down as he conceived them. City Lights published several books of Kaufman's poems during his lifetime, however, including Abomunist Manifesto, Second April in 1959, and Does the Secret Mind Whisper in 1960. In 1981 Kaufman published The Ancient Rain: Poems 1956 to 1978 with New Directions Publishing. He apparently did write his poems down on empty sacks and odd sheets of paper (Cherkovski, Collected Poems of Bob Kaufman, p. xxxii). 

"Sitting here writing things on paper
Instead of sticking the pencil into the air"
	From "Jail Poems"

Although he was baptized at age 35 while in the Merchant Marines (Cherkovski, xxxiii), like many beat writers, Kaufman became a Buddhist. In 1959, along with poets Allen Ginsberg, John Kelly, A. D. Winans, and William Margolis, he was one of the founders of Beatitude magazine, where he also worked as an editor. Yet in his poetry he seems to yearn for immortality.

"When I die
I won't stay
Dead."
	From "Dolorous Echo"

He also told his wife, before one of his last readings in San Francisco: "I keep trying to die, but you won't let me" (L.A. Times, January 14, 1986). 

According to the writer Raymond Foye, Kaufman is the person who coined the term "beatnik", and his life was filled with a great deal of suffering. In San Francisco, he was the target of beatings and harassment by the city police, and his years living in New York were filled with poverty, addiction, and imprisonment. Kaufman often incurred the wrath of the local police simply for reciting his poetry aloud in public, and it is said that in 1959 alone, at the height of the "beatnik" fad, he was arrested by the San Francisco police on disorderly charges 39 times.

In 1959, Kaufman had a small role in a movie called The Flower Thief, which was shot in North Beach by Ron Rice. In 1960 he was invited to read at Harvard and moved to New York City, giving readings at The Gaslight Café, The Paperback Book Gallery and The Living Theater. He was arrested in November of that year and taken to Bellevue Hospital. On his release, Kaufman lived in the same building as Allen Ginsberg, where he met Timothy Leary in January 1961, and took psilocybin along with Jack Kerouac, apparently for the first time (Cherkovski, p. xxxii). 

In 1961, Kaufman was nominated for England's Guinness Poetry Award, but lost to T. S. Eliot. In 1962 he was in court for an alleged assault at the nightclub Fat Black Pussycat and imprisoned on Riker's Island. While he was on Riker's, Eileen and Parker, Kaufman's infant son, returned to San Francisco. (Cherkovski, xxxii). In 1963 when he was to depart New York, he was summarily arrested for walking on the grass of Washington Square Park and incarcerated on Rikers Island, then sent as a "behavioral problem" to Bellevue Psychiatric Hospital where he underwent electro-shock treatments, which greatly affected his already bleak outlook on society. He took a vow of silence after the assassination of John F. Kennedy, which lasted 10 years. He was believed to return to this silence in the early 1980s, although he was filmed reading his poem "The Poet" at the San Francisco Art Institute in 1981. In September of that year, he was awarded a grant from the National Endowment for the Arts for $12,500. In 1982 he gave a benefit poetry reading for Beatitude at the Savoy Tivoli. In 1984 he appeared in a documentary "West Coast: Beat and Beyond" and in 1985 he gave a benefit poetry reading in North Beach, again for Beatitude. He died in 1986 of pulmonary emphysema (Cherkovski, p. xxxiii).. 

In an interview, Ken Kesey describes seeing Bob Kaufman on the streets of San Francisco's North Beach during a visit to that city with his family in the 1950s:
I can remember driving down to North Beach with my folks and seeing Bob Kaufman out there on the street. I didn't know he was Bob Kaufman at the time. He had little pieces of Band-Aid tape all over his face, about two inches wide, and little smaller ones like two inches long -- and all of them made into crosses. He came up to the cars, and he was babbling poetry into these cars. He came up to the car I was riding in, and my folks, and started jabbering this stuff into the car. I knew that this was exceptional use of the human voice and the human mind.

Poetry
His poetry made use of jazz syncopation and meter. The critic Raymond Foye wrote about him, "Adapting the harmonic complexities and spontaneous invention of bebop to poetic euphony and meter, he became the quintessential jazz poet." He frequently used jazz and bebop metaphors in his poems.
'One thousand saxophones infiltrate the city
Each with a man inside,
Hidden in ordinary cases,
Labeled FRAGILE.'
	From "Battle Report"

Poet Jack Micheline said about Kaufman, "I found his work to be essentially improvisational, and was at its best when accompanied by a jazz musician. His technique resembled that of the surreal school of poets, ranging from a powerful, visionary lyricism of satirical, near dadaistic leanings, to the more prophetic tone that can be found in his political poems."

Kaufman said of his own work, "My head is a bony guitar, strung with tongues, plucked by fingers & nails."

After learning of the assassination of John F. Kennedy, Kaufman took a Buddhist vow of silence that lasted until the end of the Vietnam War in 1973. He broke his silence by reciting his poem "All Those Ships that Never Sailed," the first lines of which are:
All those ships that never sailed
The ones with their seacocks open
That were scuttled in their stalls...
Today I bring them back
Huge and intransitory
And let them sail
Forever
According to George Fragopoulis, in his article "Singing the Silent Songs":"It is generative to consider Kaufman's silence as a kind of poetic project in and of itself, a gesture meant to interrogate the lyric's possibilities of reimagining our relationships with the world.  The history of modern poetry cannot be told without including those poets (Rimbaud, Paul Valéry, Laura (Riding) Jackson, Robert Duncan, George Oppen) who renounced poetry." (p. 152).

Personal life 
In 1944, Kaufman married Ida Berrocal. They had one daughter, Antoinette Victoria Marie (Nagle), born in New York City in 1945 (died 2008). 

He married Eileen Singe (1922–2015) in 1958; they had one child, Parker, named for Charlie Parker.

He died aged 60 in 1986 from emphysema and cirrhosis in San Francisco.

Bibliography
Abomunist Manifesto (broadside, City Lights, 1958). In 2013 Temática Editores Generales in Lima published Manifiesto Abomunista, a bilingual Spanish-English version.(All Libraries)
Second April (broadside, City Lights, 1958)(All Libraries)
Does the Secret Mind Whisper? (broadside, City Lights, 1959)(All Libraries)
Solitudes Crowded with Loneliness (New Directions, 1965)(All Libraries) 
Golden Sardine (City Lights, 1967)(All Libraries)
The Ancient Rain: Poems 1956–1978 (New Directions, 1981)(All Libraries) 
Cranial Guitar: Selected Poems by Bob Kaufman (Coffee House Press, 1996)(All Libraries)
Collected Poems of Bob Kaufman, City Lights Publishers, 2019.

References

Further reading
Abbott, Steve. "Hidden Master of the Beats." Poetry Flash (February 1986).
Anderson, TJ III. "Body and Soul: Bob Kaufman's Golden Sardine." African American Review (Summer 2000).
Charters, Ann (ed.). The Portable Beat Reader. Penguin Books. New York. 1992.  (hc);  (pbk)
Cherkovski, Neeli. Elegy for Bob Kaufman. San Francisco, CA: Sun Dog Press (1996).
Cherkovski, Neeli. Whitman's Wild Children. Venice, CA: Lapis (1988).
Christian, Barbara. "Whatever Happened to Bob Kaufman?" Black World 21 (September 1972).
Clay, Mel. Jazz Jail and God: Impressionistic Biography of Bob Kaufman. San Francisco, CA: Androgyne Books (1987).
Damon, Maha. "'Unmeaning Jargon'/Uncanonized Beatitude: Bob Kaufman, Poet", South Atlantic Quarterly 87.4 (Fall 1988).
Foye, Raymond. "Bob Kaufman, A Proven Glory", The Poetry Project Newsletter (March 1986).
Kaufman, Eileen. "Laughter Sounds Orange at Night." In Arthur Knight and Kit Knight (eds), The Beat Vision: A Primary Sourcebook, New York: Paragon (1967).
Lindberg, Kathryne V. "Bob Kaufman, Sir Real", Talisman 11 (Fall 1993).
Seymore, Tony. "Crimes of a Warrior Poet", Players Magazine (December 1983).
Winans, A.D. "Bob Kaufman". The American Poetry Review (May/June 2000).

External links
Kathryne V. Lindberg, "About Bob Kaufman"
C. Natale Peditto, "Bob Kaufman: The Jazz Poet of the Streets"
A.D. Winans Remembers Bob Kaufman 
"Bob Kaufman (1925-1986)", Modern American Poetry
Happy Belated Birthday Bob Kaufman! The New Times Holler
FBI file on Bob Kaufman at the Internet Archive

1925 births
1986 deaths
African-American poets
American people of German-Jewish descent
American people of Martiniquais descent
American sailors
Beat Generation poets
Elective mutes
Jewish American poets
Outlaw poets
Silence
20th-century American poets
Writers from New Orleans
The New School alumni
African-American Jews
Deaths from cirrhosis
20th-century African-American writers
20th-century American Jews